Collin Johnson (born September 23, 1997) is an American football wide receiver for the New York Giants of the National Football League (NFL). He played college football at Texas. He is the son of College Football Hall of Fame cornerback Johnnie Johnson and attended high school at Valley Christian in San Jose. As of 2020, Johnson is the tallest wide receiver in the NFL.

High school career 
Attending Valley Christian in San Jose, Johnson was limited by injury in both his sophomore and senior seasons but still eclipsed 1,100 yards as a senior. By the winter of his sophomore year, Johnson had garnered scholarship offers from USC, Arizona State, Utah, Rutgers, Cal, and TCU, but committed to Texas on April 17, 2014 along with his brother Kirk, a running back who is a year older than Collin.

College career 
Johnson played in every game as a freshman and started one. As a sophomore, he started nine games and completed the season with 54 catches.

Early in his junior season, Johnson hauled in a career-high 191 yards against USC, including 47 on a go-ahead touchdown. After underperforming against Oklahoma, Johnson was replaced atop the depth chart by Dorian Leonard. A year later, Johnson called the benching a learning opportunity and a chance for personal growth.

Heading into his senior year, coach Tom Herman noted that Johnson improved markedly in the offseason. Johnson also landed on the Walter Camp Award, Wuerffel Award, and Biletnikoff Award preseason watchlists.

Johnson's acrobatics and 124 yards against TCU in week four earned him National Player of the Week accolades. After a slight injury to his knee, Johnson missed the Nov 10 game against Texas Tech. In the 2018 Big 12 Championship Game, Johnson set the title game record for receiving yards with 177. The performance came after Johnson was excluded from the All-Big 12 team for 2018. His coaches also lauded him for increased blocking skills throughout the season.

Professional career

Jacksonville Jaguars
Johnson was selected by the Jacksonville Jaguars in the fifth round with the 165th overall pick in the 2020 NFL Draft.  The Jaguars received the 165th pick used to select Johnson as a result from a trade that sent Dante Fowler to the Los Angeles Rams.

In Week 5 against the Houston Texans, Johnson recorded three catches for 30 yards and his first career touchdown reception during the 30–14 loss. In Week 11 against the Cleveland Browns, Johnson recorded four catches for 96 yards and a touchdown during the 27–25 loss. Jaguars quarterback Mike Glennon threw a 46-yard pass that Johnson ran in for his second touchdown of the year. On January 2, 2021, Johnson was placed on injured reserve.

On August 31, 2021, Johnson was waived by the Jaguars.

New York Giants
On September 1, 2021, Johnson was claimed off waivers by the New York Giants. On August 24, 2022, Johnson was placed on injured reserve with a torn achilles.

Personal life 
Johnson's father Johnnie also played at Texas and played for ten years in the NFL; he was inducted into the College Football Hall of Fame in 2007. Collin's older brother Kirk is also a football player at Texas, and his sister Camille is a member of the track and field team.
On June 26, 2020, Collin proposed to his girlfriend since high school, Sara Machado.

References

External links 
 Jacksonville Jaguars bio
 Texas Longhorns bio

1997 births
Living people
Players of American football from San Jose, California
American football wide receivers
Texas Longhorns football players
Jacksonville Jaguars players
New York Giants players